Aandava Perumal is a 2013 Indian Tamil-language film directed by Priyan (who previously directed Kottie (2010) and Vijaynagaram (2013)) and starring Shivan and Idhaya.

Cast 
Shivan as Sarathy
Idhaya as Anita 
Sasi as Ravi
Lollu Sabha Jeeva
Manimaran
Girish

Release and reception 
The film released on 1 March 2013 along with six other films.

Malini Mannath of The New Indian Express opined that "A film you wouldn't mind watching once". A critic from The Times of India said that "Aandava Perumal is hampered by the stereotypes it portrays, and then wastes times untying these knots". A critic from Sify wrote that "The film less than 2 hours is a total waste of time". A critic from Behindwoods stated that the film was "As cliched and contrived as it can get".

References

External links